The year 627 BC was a year of the pre-Julian Roman calendar. In the Roman Empire, it was known as year 127 Ab urbe condita . The denomination 627 BC for this year has been used since the early medieval period, when the Anno Domini calendar era became the prevalent method in Europe for naming years.

Events
 Battle of Xiao, between the states of Jin and Qin in China.
 Traditional date for the foundation of Epidamnus by Corinth, today Durrës in Albania.
 Sinsharishkun succeeds his brother Ashur-etil-ilani as king of Assyria (approximate date).

Births

Deaths
 Ashurbanipal, Assyrian king (approximate date) (b. 685 BC)
 Ashur-etil-ilani, Assyrian king
 Cypselus, Greek tyrant of Corinth
 Kandalanu, Babylonian king

References